"The Bottle Let Me Down" is a song written and recorded by American country music artist Merle Haggard and The Strangers.  It was released in August 1966 as the second single from the album Swinging Doors.  The song peaked at number three on the U.S. Billboard Hot Country Singles.

Content
The song is about a man who could no longer find solace from binge drinking to relieve his grief over a lost love.

Chart performance

Porter Wagoner version

References

1966 singles
Merle Haggard songs
Songs about alcohol
Songs written by Merle Haggard
Song recordings produced by Ken Nelson (American record producer)
Capitol Records singles
1966 songs